Jim Allan may refer to:
Jim Allan (curler), New Zealand and Australian curler
Jim Allan (singer), American singer - see Why Don't You Believe Me?
Jim Allan (editor), Canadian editor of the book An Introduction To Elvish - see Languages of Arda
A New Zealand pipe major - see Canterbury Caledonian Society Pipe Band
A UK film producer - see I Bought a Vampire Motorcycle
A UK local politician - see North Tyneside Council election, 2008

See also 
James Allan (disambiguation)
Jimmy Allan (disambiguation)
James Allen (disambiguation)